The Trindade hotspot is a working hypothesis supposing that the submarine volcanic chain Vitória-Trindade, off the eastern coast of Brazil in the southern Atlantic Ocean, is a volcanic hotspot chain. It was considered that the supposed hot-spot should be responsible for the creation of the east-west trending Vitória-Trindade seamount chain, which includes the Trindade and Martim Vaz archipelago at its easternmost end. Trindade, a small island in the archipelago, is the hotspot's most recent eruptive center.

This ideas was based on the geochemical data, especially of the highly silica-undersaturated alkaline ultramafic rocks of the Trindade Island and Martim Vaz Island. The isotopic data is OIB-type, which is favourable to the hot-spot hypothesis. However, the volcanic chain direction is E-W and the absolute motion vector of the South America Plate is NW. Therefore, the volcanic chain cannot be a hot-spot chain. Because of the same reason, the Fernando de Noronha Volcanic chain also is not a hot-spot chain. On the other hand, the NW-SE magmatic alignments, such as the Cruzeiro do Sul Chain, Bahia Chain, and Macau-Queimado, are considered to be hot-spot chains.

References

 
 

Hotspots of the Atlantic Ocean
Geology of Brazil